Chhatapur Assembly constituency is an assembly constituency in Supaul district in the Indian state of Bihar. It is an open seat from 2010, but earlier was reserved for scheduled castes.

Overview
As per Delimitation of Parliamentary and Assembly constituencies Order, 2008, No. 45  Chhatapur Assembly constituency is composed of the following: Chhatapur and Basantpur community development blocks.

Chhatapur Assembly constituency is part of No. 8 Supaul (Lok Sabha constituency).

Members of Vidhan Sabha

Election Results

2020

1990 Election
 Yogendra Nr. Sardar (JD) : 57,721 votes  
 Kumbh Nr. Sardar (INC) : 33698

1977 Election
 Sitaram Paswan (Janata Party) : 27,709 votes  
 Kumbh Narayan Sardar (INC) : 12296

References

External links
 

Assembly constituencies of Bihar
Politics of Supaul district